The 2008 BCS National Championship Game (branded as the 2008 Allstate BCS National Championship Game for sponsorship reasons) was played at the Louisiana Superdome in New Orleans, Louisiana, on Monday, January 7, 2008, and featured the No. 1 and No. 2 college football teams in the United States as determined by the BCS Poll (a combination of polls and computer formulas) to decide the BCS National Championship for the 2007 NCAA Division I FBS football season.

The game featured No. 1 Big Ten champion Ohio State Buckeyes hosting No. 2 SEC champion LSU Tigers.  It also featured the second postseason matchup between head coaches Jim Tressel and Les Miles in four seasons.  The first was the 2004 Alamo Bowl, when Tressel's Buckeyes defeated Miles' Oklahoma State Cowboys, 33–7, in what turned out to be Miles' last game with the Cowboys, as he was hired by LSU to replace Nick Saban five days later.

Background

Team selection
Prior to the last weekend of the regular season, it looked like the national championship game would be played between Missouri and West Virginia.  However, Missouri lost to Oklahoma 38-17 in the Big 12 Championship Game and West Virginia was shocked by their arch-rival Pitt 13-9 in the Backyard Brawl.  This threw the BCS and college football world into upheaval.  By virtue of winning the Big Ten and having only one loss, Ohio State looked to be guaranteed a berth in the BCS championship game.  After much speculation, LSU was revealed to be the number two team in the ratings, and therefore the Buckeyes' opponent in the title game.

Pregame buildup

After intense media speculation, including a report on ESPN which indicated that he was on the verge of taking the Michigan job, LSU head coach Les Miles announced just before the SEC championship game on December 1 that he was staying.  Shortly thereafter, he agreed to a contract extension at LSU.  Additionally, LSU defensive coordinator Bo Pelini accepted the head coaching job at Nebraska the day after the SEC title game. With the blessing of Nebraska athletic director Tom Osborne, Pelini returned to Baton Rouge to prepare for the BCS championship game.

As for the Buckeyes, two cornerbacks, Donald Washington and Eugene Clifford, were reported to be suspended for this game for violating team rules.  However, Ohio State's athletic director said on December 27 that the reported suspension of Washington was erroneous.

Game summary

First quarter
LSU won the          coin toss and deferred to the second half. After receiving the opening kickoff, Ohio State started slowly on offense before Chris Wells broke off a 65-yard touchdown run for the first score of the game. LSU went three-and-out deep in their own territory and punted on their first possession. Ohio State quickly added a field goal by Ryan Pretorius to go up 10-0. LSU then marched efficiently down field, but their 14-play/65-yard drive stalled in the red zone and Colt David kicked a 32-yard field goal. The first quarter ended with LSU on offense and trailing, 10-3.

Second quarter

LSU scored early in the period with a 13-yard Matt Flynn touchdown pass to Tight End Richard Dickson, tying the score at 10. The drive was aided by two penalties totaling 28 yards by Ohio State's defense. LSU's Ricky Jean-Francois then blocked a 38-yard Pretorius field goal attempt on Ohio State's next possession. Momentum appeared to be shifting to LSU's sideline. LSU began the ensuing drive from their 34. The Tigers marched 66 yards in 3:28; a 10-yard Brandon LaFell touchdown reception from Flynn culminated the drive. On the next Buckeye possession, quarterback Todd Boeckman was intercepted by cornerback Chevis Jackson who returned the ball 34 yards into Ohio State territory. LSU moved down to the goal line and running back Jacob Hester punched the ball in to give the Tigers a 14-point lead. A short Buckeye drive led to a punt and LSU was content to go into halftime having scored 24 unanswered points.

Third quarter
LSU started the second half with the ball and a 24-10 lead. The Ohio State defense appeared to have forced a punt on LSU's first drive, but a roughing the punter penalty by Buckeye linebacker Austin Spitler gave LSU a first down. The Tigers parlayed the personal foul into a touchdown, as Early Doucet later received a short pass from Flynn and broke a series of tackles at the five-yard line and walked into the endzone. Ohio State seemed to be fading but with 3:50 left in the quarter, Flynn was intercepted by cornerback Malcolm Jenkins, who returned the ball 21 yards to the LSU 11. Three "Beanie" Wells runs brought the Buckeye offense down to the five and Boeckman proceeded to throw a touchdown pass to wide receiver Brian Robiskie on fourth down, pulling the Buckeyes to within 31-17.

Fourth quarter

After LSU punted early in the quarter Ohio State put together a solid drive, reaching the LSU 34. However, the offense stalled and the Buckeyes were forced to go for it on fourth-and-seven. Boeckman dropped back to pass and was hit on his throwing arm just before the arm could start to come forward. The hit—made by LSU linebacker Ali Highsmith—caused a fumble and LSU recovered in Ohio State territory. The play was reviewed to determine if it was a forward pass but the ruling on the field was upheld and LSU got the ball with 10:37 left in the game. The Tigers then went three-and-out, but on Ohio State's next possession Boeckman was intercepted by safety Curtis Taylor. With 5:37 remaining, LSU's fate as National Champions was essentially sealed. 

The Tigers added another touchdown, a five-yard strike from Flynn to LaFell (his second touchdown reception of the game). Ohio State then scored on a late touchdown pass from Boeckman to wide receiver Brian Hartline before failing to convert an onside kick. LSU ran out the clock and celebrated their 38-24 BCS National Championship Game win.

Historical implications
This was the first national championship game in the BCS era to feature two teams that had previously won a BCS national championship.  Louisiana State became the first school ever to win two BCS championships.  The Tigers had previously defeated Oklahoma, 21-14, in the 2004 Sugar Bowl, which served as the 2003 season's BCS championship game.

LSU was the first team since 1960 to be national champion with two losses.

Scoring summary

Scoring
First quarter
 Ohio State - Chris Wells 69 Yd TD Run (Ryan Pretorius Kick) 13:34
 Ohio State - Ryan Pretorius -25 Yd FG 9:12
 LSU - Colt David 32 Yd FG 2:21
Second quarter
 LSU - Richard Dickson 13 Yd TD Pass From Matt Flynn (Colt David Kick) 13:00
 LSU - Brandon LaFell 10 Yd TD Pass From Matt Flynn (Colt David Kick) 7:25
 LSU - Jacob Hester 1 Yd TD Run (Colt David Kick) 4:16
Third quarter
 LSU - Earley Doucet 4 Yd TD Pass From Matt Flynn (Colt David Kick) 9:04
 Ohio State - Brian Robiskie 5 Yd TD Pass From Todd Boeckman (Ryan Pretorius Kick) 1:38
Fourth quarter
 LSU - Richard Dickson 5 Yd TD Pass From Matt Flynn (Colt David Kick) 1:50
 Ohio State - Brian Hartline 15 TD Pass From Todd Boeckman (Ryan Pretorius Kick) 1:13

Statistics

LSU
 QB Matt Flynn: 19/27, 174 yds, 4 TD
 RB Jacob Hester: 21 rush, 86 yds, TD
 WR Early Doucet: 7 rec, 51 yds, TD
 TE Richard Dickson: 4 rec, 44 yds, 2 TD

Ohio State
 QB Todd Boeckman: 15/26, 208 yds, 2 TD, 2 Int 
 RB Chris Wells: 20 rush, 146 yds, TD
 WR Brian Hartline: 6 rec, 75 yds, TD

Game records

Trivia
Baton Rouge attorney Stephen Babcock got the judge in an insurance case to issue a continuance in the case by pointing out that both he and the opposing attorney had tickets to the game, and "All counsel to this matter unequivocally agree that the presence of LSU in the aforementioned contest of pigskin skill unquestionably constitutes good grounds".  The judge obliged and moved the trial date.

References

External links
 ESPN.com game article

BCS National Championship Game
LSU Tigers football bowl games
Ohio State Buckeyes football bowl games
Football, American
BCS National Championship Game
BCS National Championship
BCS National Championship Game
2000s in New Orleans